Made in Staten Island is a short-lived American reality television series that premiered on MTV on January 14, 2019 in the United States. The show followed eight young adults living in Staten Island, trying to avoid the influence of local organized crime. The program was described as "Mob Wives for the MTV crowd". It was the network's second attempt to create a Staten Island-focused reality series, after 2010's aborted Bridge & Tunnel.

The show only aired three episodes all together before the series was quietly ended; all mention of the series has also been expunged from MTV's websites.

In March 2020, MTV announced that it did continue to work with the subjects of Made in Staten Island, but had decided to take a different focus and shift more to showing their families in full. The new version of the series, Families of the Mafia, premiered on April 9.

Cast members

 Karina Seabrook
 Paulie Fusco
 Kayla Gonzalez
 Christian "CP" Patterson
 Dennie Augustine
 Taylor O'Toole
 Joe O'Toole
 Jordan "Bones" James

Episodes

References

MTV reality television series
2010s American reality television series
2019 American television series debuts
2019 American television series endings
Television shows set in Staten Island